The United States District Court for the District of Puerto Rico (in case citations, D.P.R.) is the federal district court whose jurisdiction comprises the Commonwealth of Puerto Rico. The court is based in San Juan.  The main building is the Clemente Ruiz Nazario United States Courthouse located in the Hato Rey district of San Juan. The magistrate judges are located in the adjacent Federico Degetau Federal Building, and several senior district judges hold court at the Jose V. Toledo Federal Building and U.S. Courthouse in Old San Juan. The old courthouse also houses the U.S. Bankruptcy Court. Most appeals from this court are heard by the United States Court of Appeals for the First Circuit, which is headquartered in Boston but hears appeals at the Old San Juan courthouse for two sessions each year. Patent claims as well as claims against the U.S. government under the Tucker Act are appealed to the Federal Circuit.

The current United States Attorney is W. Stephen Muldrow.

Scope and relevance 

The United States first established a federal court in Puerto Rico under the Foraker Act of 1900. This court was a territorial court, operating within what the Supreme Court would soon define in the Insular Cases as an unincorporated territory of the United States. As such, the court was established under Article IV rather than Article III of the United States Constitution. The Supreme Court of the United States discussed the nature of the court in Balzac v. Porto Rico, 258 U.S. 298 (1922). Because the court was a territorial court rather than a full-fledged District Court, its judges did not enjoy Article III protections such as life tenure.

The District Court in Puerto Rico continued to be an Article IV court even after Puerto Rico attained its commonwealth status. However, in 1966, the U.S. Congress conferred life tenure on the federal judges of Puerto Rico, transforming the court into a full-fledged Article III district court with the same status as the other United States District Courts throughout the country. The congressional report on the bill making this change described the change of status as being "appropriate in light of the court's caseload and the conferral of Commonwealth status on Puerto Rico," and also explained:

There is no reason why the U.S. District Judges for the District of Puerto Rico should not be placed in a position of parity as to tenure with all other Federal Judges throughout our judicial system. Moreover, federal litigants in Puerto Rico should not be denied the benefit of judges made independent by life tenure from the pressures of those who might influence his chances of reappointment, which benefits the Constitution guarantees to the litigants in all other Federal Courts. These judges in Puerto Rico have and will have the exacting same heavy responsibilities as all other Federal district judges and, therefore, they should have the same independence, security, and retirement benefits to which all other Federal district judges are entitled.

See 1966 U.S.C.C.A.N. 2786-90; see also Examining Bd. of Engineers Architects and Surveyors v. Flores de Otero, 426 U.S. 572, 595 n.26 (1976) ("The reason given for this [law] was that the Federal District Court in Puerto Rico 'is in its jurisdiction, powers, and responsibilities the same as the U.S. district courts in the (several) states'."). This important change in the federal judicial structure of the island was implemented not as a request of the Commonwealth government, but rather at the repeated request of the Judicial Conference of the United States. See Senate Report No. 1504, 1966 U.S.C.C.A.N. 2786-90.

No similar law has been passed for the three insular territories that still have Article IV status, though there have been calls from time to time that these judges also deserve the protection of life tenure.

Current judges 
:

Former judges

Chief judges

Succession of seats

Article IV judges 

Judges who served on the Court from 1900 to 1966, before it became an Article III court, were:

 William H. Holt (1900–1904)
 Charles F. McKenna (1904–1906)
 Bernard Shandon Rodey (1906–1910)
 John J. Jenkins (1910–1911)
 Paul Charlton (1911–1913)
 Peter J. Hamilton (1913–1921)
 Arthur F. Odlin (1921–1925)
 Ira K. Wells (1925–1933)
 Robert A. Cooper (1933–1947)
 David Chávez (1947–1950)
 Thomas H. Roberts (1950–1952)
 Clemente Ruiz-Nazario (1952–1966)
 Hiram Rafael Cáncio (1965–1966)

During this period, judges for the District of Puerto Rico were appointed by the president for 4-year terms until 1938, and thereafter for 8-year terms. The court statutorily comprised a single judge until 1961, when a second judgeship was authorized by Congress, although the position was not actually filled until 1965. Until the 1950s, when the District Court judgeship was vacant, when the judge was away from Puerto Rico, or when the court's docket became overly backlogged, sitting judges of the Supreme Court of Puerto Rico were designated to act as judges of the federal court.

Judge Ruiz-Nazario, appointed by President Harry Truman in 1952, was the first Puerto Rican to serve as a judge of Puerto Rico's federal court.

See also 

 Courts of the United States
 Federal tribunals in the United States
 List of current United States district judges
 List of United States federal courthouses in Puerto Rico
 United States District Court

References 

 
 CONSEJO DE SALUD PLAYA DE PONCE v. RULLAN. 586 F.Supp.2d 22 (2008). CONSEJO DE SALUD PLAYA DE PONCE, et al., Plaintiffs v. Johnny RULLAN, Secretary of Health of the Commonwealth of Puerto Rico, Defendant. Civil Nos. 06–1260(GAG), 06-1524(GAG). United States District Court, D. Puerto Rico. October 10, 2008. As Corrected November 10, 2008. Retrieved 1 April 2013.
 Opinion and Order: Consejo de Salud de la Playa de Ponce vs. Johnny Rullan, Secretary of Health of the Commonwealth of Puerto Rico.  Gustavo A. Gelpi.  USDC, D of Puerto Rico. San Juan, PR. Civil Numbers 06-1260 (GAG) and 06-1524 (GAG) (Consolidated). 10 November 2008. Retrieved 1 April 2013.
 Guillermo A. Baralt, History of the Federal Court in Puerto Rico: 1899–1999 (2004) (Translated into English by Janis Palma, also published in Spanish as Historia del Tribunal Federal de Puerto Rico)

External links 
 Official Site
 The Exclusion of Non-English-Speaking Jurors: Remedying a Century of Denial of the Sixth Amendment in the Federal Courts of Puerto Rico. Jasmine B. Gonzales Rose. Harvard Civil Rights-Civil Liberties Law Review. Vol. 46. (2011) Pages 497–549.

Puerto Rico
1966 establishments in Puerto Rico
Courthouses in Puerto Rico
San Juan, Puerto Rico
Courts and tribunals established in 1966